WVKJ (89.9 FM) is a radio station licensed to serve the community of Dublin, New Hampshire. The station is owned by The Kingdom Christian Ministries, and airs a religious format.

The station was assigned the WVKJ call letters by the Federal Communications Commission on May 10, 2011.

References

External links
 Official Website
 FCC Public Inspection File for WVKJ
 

VKJ
Radio stations established in 2011
2011 establishments in New Hampshire
Dublin, New Hampshire